London 3 North East was an English rugby union league that was the eighth level of club rugby union in England and was available to sides from north east London, Essex, Cambridgeshire, Norfolk and Suffolk.  Promoted clubs move into London 2 North East.  Relegated teams tended to drop to Eastern Counties 1 or Essex 1 depending on geographical location, with new teams also coming from these leagues.  

The league was discontinued at the end of the 2016–17 season as the RFU decided to instead create two new leagues - London 3 Eastern Counties and London 3 Essex - to reduce travelling times for teams involved.  The teams from London 3 North East were transferred to either London 3 Eastern Counties or London 3 Essex depending on geography, along with additional teams being promoted from regional leagues if needed.

Participating Teams 2016-17
Basildon
East London (promoted from Essex 1)
Ely (promoted from Eastern Counties 1)
Harlow
Ilford Wanderers
Lowestoft & Great Yarmouth 
May & Baker
Southwold  
Stowmarket
Upnoncester RFC
Wanstead
West Norfolk

Participating Teams 2015-16
Beccles
Epping Upper Clapton (promoted from Essex 1)
Harlow
Lowestoft & Great Yarmouth 
May & Baker (promoted from Essex 1)
Old Brentwoods
Old Cooperians (relegated from London 2 North East)
Southwold  (promoted from Eastern Counties 1)
Stowmarket
Upminster
Wanstead
West Norfolk

Participating Teams 2014-15
Beccles
Billericay (promoted from Essex 1)
Cantabrigian
Clacton (promoted from Essex 1)
Harlow
Lowestoft & Great Yarmouth (relegated from London 2 North East)
Old Brentwoods
Stowmarket (relegated from London 2 North East)
Sudbury
Upminster
Wanstead
West Norfolk (promoted from Eastern Counties 1)

Participating Teams 2013-14
Beccles
Campion (promoted from Eastern Counties 1)
Cantabrigian
Canvey Island
Harlow
Old Brentwoods
Old Cooperians (promoted from Essex 1)
Sudbury
Upminster
Wansted
Wisbech
Wymondham (promoted from Eastern Counties 1)

Participating Teams 2012-13
Beccles
Cantabrigian	
Canvey Island
East London
Harlow
Norwich
Old Brentwoods
South Woodham Ferrers	
Sudbury
Upminster
Wanstead
Wisbech

Original teams

When this division as introduced in 2000 (as London 4 North East) it contained the following teams:

Bury St Edmunds - relegated from London 3 North East (8th)
Canvey Island - relegated from London 3 North East (9th)
Ely - relegated from London 3 North East (12th)
Hadleigh - relegated from London 3 North East (10th)
Holt - relegated from London 3 North East (13th)
Newmarket - relegated from London 3 North East (14th)
Saffron Walden - promoted from Eastern Counties 1 (champions)
Thetford - relegated from London 3 North East (7th)
West Norfolk - relegated from London 3 North East (11th)
Woodbridge - promoted from Eastern Counties 1 (runners up)

London 3 North East honours

London 4 North East (2000–2009)

Originally known as London 4 North East, this division was a tier 8 league with promotion up to London 3 North East and relegation down to Eastern Counties 1 and (from 2003–04) Essex 1.

London 3 North East (2009–2017)

League restructuring by the RFU ahead of the 2009–10 season saw London 4 North East renamed as London 3 North East.  Remaining as a tier 8 league, promotion was to London 2 North East (formerly London 3 North East), while relegation continued to either Eastern Counties 1 or Essex 1.  The division was cancelled at the end of the 2016–17 season, with all non-promoted teams moving into the newly introduced London 3 Eastern Counties and London 3 Essex.

Number of league titles

Braintree (2)
Campion (2)
Saffron Walden (2)
Basildon (1)
Beccles (1)
Bury St Edmunds (1)
Colchester (1)
Harlow (1)
Mersea Island (1)
Old Cooperians (1)
Rochford Hundred (1)
South Woodham Ferrers (1)
Sudbury (1)

Notes

See also
Eastern Counties RFU
 English rugby union system
 Rugby union in England

References

8
4